The Roman Catholic Diocese of Roraima is a diocese located in the state of Roraima in the Ecclesiastical province of Manaus in Brazil.

History
 1934: Established as Apostolic Administration of Rio Branco
 August 30, 1944: Promoted as Territorial Prelature of Rio Branco
 April 29, 1963: Renamed as Territorial Prelature of Roraima
 October 16, 1979: Promoted as Diocese of Roraima

Leadership
Prelates of Roraima
José Nepote-Fus, I.M.C.  (18 April 1952 - December 1965) Resigned
Servílio Conti, I.M.C.  (1 January 1965 - 3 May 1975) Resigned
Aldo Mongiano, I.M.C. (14 May 1975 - 4 December 1979) appointed bishop of the diocese
Bishops of Roraima
Aldo Mongiano, I.M.C. (4 December 1979 Appointed - 26 June 1996) Resigned
Apparecido José Dias, S.V.D. (26 June 1996 - 29 May 2004) Died
Roque Paloschi (18 May 2005 – 14 October 2015)
Mário Antônio da Silva (22 June 2016 – present)

References
 GCatholic.org
 Catholic Hierarchy

Roman Catholic dioceses in Brazil
Christian organizations established in 1934
Roraima, Roman Catholic Diocese of
Roman Catholic dioceses and prelatures established in the 20th century